Zabid Hossain (born 12 September 1992) is a Bangladeshi cricketer. He made his first-class debut for Dhaka Metropolis in the 2014–15 National Cricket League on 25 January 2015.

References

External links
 

1992 births
Living people
Bangladeshi cricketers
Dhaka Metropolis cricketers
Place of birth missing (living people)